Für Dich or Für dich may refer to:

 Für Dich, a 1973 album by Peggy March
 Für Dich, a 2014 album by Andreas Martin
 Für Dich (Vanessa Mai album), 2016
 Für dich. (Xavier Naidoo album), 2017
 "Für dich" (song), a 2003 single by Yvonne Catterfeld